Silence is a 1931 American pre-Code crime film directed by Louis J. Gasnier and Max Marcin and written by Max Marcin, adapted from his play. The film stars Clive Brook, Marjorie Rambeau, Peggy Shannon, Charles Starrett, Willard Robertson, John Wray and Frank Sheridan. It was released on August 29, 1931, by Paramount Pictures.

Plot
A gray-haired convict, within the shadows of the gallows, tells his story to the prison chaplain beginning twenty years earlier when he was sent to prison for a crime he did not commit.

Cast
Clive Brook as Jim Warren
Marjorie Rambeau as Mollie Burke
Peggy Shannon as Norma Davis / Norma Powers
Charles Starrett as Arthur Lawrence
Willard Robertson as Phil Powers
John Wray as Harry Silvers
Frank Sheridan as Joel Clarke
Paul Nicholson as Walter Pritchard
John M. Sullivan as Father Ryan 
Ben Taggart as Alderman Conners
Charles Trowbridge as Mallory
Wade Boteler as Detective
Robert Homans as Detective

See also
 The House That Shadows Built (1931 Paramount promotional film with excerpts of Silence)

References

External links
 

1931 films
American crime films
1931 crime films
Paramount Pictures films
Films directed by Louis J. Gasnier
American black-and-white films
1930s English-language films
1930s American films